Arijan Lakić (born 20 January 2000) is a Serbian professional basketball player for Zadar of the ABA League and the Croatian League.

Early career 
In 2009, Lakić started to play basketball for KK Sava from Belgrade. In Summer 2016, he was added to the Crvena zvezda U18 team. He won the second place at the 2017–18 Junior ABA League season with the Zvezda. Over six season games, he averaged 5.8 points, 3.6 rebounds and 3.8 assists per game.

Professional career 
On 7 February 2018, Lakić signed a four-year professional contract with Crvena zvezda. Prior to the 2018–19 season, he was loaned out to FMP. Later, he was cut off from the 2018–19 FMP season roster due to back injury. After a 15-month break due to the injury, he was loaned to Vrijednosnice Osijek of the Croatian League for the 2019–20 season in December 2019. O 7 December 2019, Lakić made his professional debut in an 85–74 win over Šibenka. He recorded an assist and 2 steals in 8 minutes of playing time. Through 11 games in the season, Lakić averaged four points, three rebounds, and 2.4 assists per game. In May 2021, Lakić was loaned to Borac Čačak for the 2021 Basketball League of Serbia playoffs. In August 2021, he joined Bosnian club Spars Sarajevo for the 2021–22 season.

On 21 July 2022, Lakić signed a two-year contract with Croatian club Zadar of the ABA League.

National team career
Lakić was a member of the Serbian under-18 team that won the gold medal at the 2018 FIBA Europe Under-18 Championship in Latvia. Over seven tournament games, he averaged 3.4 points, 2.7 rebounds and 4.1 assists per game.

Personal life 
His family originates from Benkovac, Croatia.

References

External links 
 Profile at eurobasket.com
 Profile at euroleague.net
 Profile at realgm.com
 Profile at ABA League

2000 births
Living people
ABA League players
Basketball League of Serbia players
Basketball players from Belgrade
KK Borac Čačak players
KK Crvena zvezda youth players
KK Vrijednosnice Osijek players
KK Zadar players
OKK Spars players
Point guards
Shooting guards
Serbian expatriate basketball people in Bosnia and Herzegovina
Serbian expatriate basketball people in Croatia
Serbian men's basketball players
Serbian people of Croatian descent